Paulo Jorge da Silva Conceição (born 29 December 1993) is a Portuguese high jumper who has competed for S.L. Benfica since 2011.

Paulo Conceição jumped 2.28m in 2020, setting a new Portuguese record. The previous record was 2.24m, also by Paulo Conceição, back in 2016. With 2.20 metres (7 ft 2.6 in), Paulo Conceição holds the Portuguese U-23 record in men's high jump. His 2014 record 2.20m – set in Lisbon on 16 July 2014 – is the third best in national history, and only Rafael Gonçalves has achieved a higher jump, which he did on three occasions. He is also an indoor Portuguese U-23 record holder with a mark of 2.16 m (2014).

Paulo Conceição has a silver medal from the Mediterranean U23 Championships, in the city of Aubagne (France, near Marseille).

At a young age he practiced all that was sport at school: gymnastics, volleyball, badminton, handball... but it was in basketball that he best distinguished. While he won one Complete Athlete youth tournament, in school he has obtained good results in the high jump and was already thinking about dedicating himself more seriously to athletics when he found professor Paulo Barrigana.

He joined Paulo Barrigana's group and had a great progression in this discipline. In 2011 he jumped over 2m and only three years later Paulo Conceição already represented Portugal at the Mediterranean U23 Championships, in Aubagne, where he became a silver medallist with 2.15m.

Paulo Conceição also represented Portugal at the European Athletics U23 Championships Tampere 2013 (Finland) at the Ibero American Championships São Paulo 2014 (Brazil), at the European Championships Under 23 Dublin 2014 (Ireland) and at the European Athletics Team Championships Tallinn 2014 (Estonia).

Yearly Progression:
High Jump (outdoors/indoors): 2009: 1.91/-i; 2010: 1.98/-i; 2011: 2.04/-i; 2012: -/2.02i; 2013: 2.19/2.12i; 2014: 2.20/2.16i

References

1993 births
Living people
Portuguese male high jumpers
Sportspeople from Coimbra
S.L. Benfica athletes
European Games competitors for Portugal
Athletes (track and field) at the 2019 European Games